Nocardioides caeni is a gram-positive and non-motile bacterium from the genus Nocardioides that has been isolated from sludge from domestic wastewater in Daejeon, South Korea.

References

External links
Type strain of Nocardioides caeni at BacDive -  the Bacterial Diversity Metadatabase	

caeni
Bacteria described in 2009